TTCP may refer to:

ttcp, a computer utility program for measuring network throughput
T/TCP, a variant of the TCP protocol
The Technical Cooperation Program, an international organisation concerned with cooperation on defence science and technology matters
The ICAO code for Arthur Napoleon Raymond Robinson International Airport (formerly Crown Point Airport) on the island of Tobago (TTCP - Trinidad & Tobago Crown Point)
Tetracalciumphosphate Ca4(PO4)2